Éder Arreola (born November 13, 1991) is an American professional soccer player who currently plays for San Diego 1904 FC in the National Independent Soccer Association.

Career

College and Amateur
He played four years of college soccer at the University of California, Los Angeles at the age of 16 between 2008 and 2011.

While at college, Arreola also appeared for USL PDL club Orange County Blue Star in 2009.

Additionally, in college Arreola often attended classes and practiced with his teammates.

Professional
Arreola was drafted 18th in the 2012 MLS Supplemental Draft by Houston Dynamo, but didn't earn a contact with the team.

Arreola was part of the Cal FC team that has a successful US Open Cup run in 2012, and later signed with Mexican third division club Delfines.

In February 2014, Arreola joined LA Galaxy II for their inaugural season in the USL Pro.

Arreola was signed by Phoenix Rising FC of the United Soccer Leagues on April 28, 2017.

Following the United Soccer League season, Arreola joined California United FC II in the United Premier Soccer League where he contributed to the team winning the 2017 Fall Season National Championship.

In October 2018, Arreola and fellow American Pablo Cruz left Shirak SC.

In August 2019, he joined San Diego 1904 FC, an expansion team in the National Independent Soccer Association. Following the team's hiatus, he returned to 1904 ahead of the Spring 2021 season.

International
Arreola was a member of the U.S. residency program in Bradenton, Florida, and played for the U.S. Under-17 for two years. He later moved on to the U-20 national team, whom he has represented the U.S. at the 2011 CONCACAF U-20 Championship 2011 CONCACAF U-20 Championship squads. Has also represented the U.S. in lower ages U-15 & U-16.

References

External links

1991 births
Living people
American soccer players
American sportspeople of Mexican descent
UCLA Bruins men's soccer players
Orange County Blue Star players
Cal FC players
LA Galaxy II players
Ventura County Fusion players
Association football defenders
Soccer players from California
Houston Dynamo FC draft picks
Phoenix Rising FC players
USL League Two players
USL Championship players
United States men's under-20 international soccer players
National Premier Soccer League players
National Independent Soccer Association players